Scott Brant may refer to:

Scott Brant (cricketer) (born 1983), Zimbabwean cricketer
Scott Brant (speedway rider) (born 1968), American professional speedway rider